Tyrone "Ty" Johnson (born July 28, 1992) is an American professional basketball player. 

Born and raised in Plainfield, New Jersey, Johnson played at Plainfield High School before transferring to Montrose Christian School for his senior year in an effort to position himself better for collegiate basketball.

College career
Prior to his freshman year at Villanova, Johnson broke his left foot. Johnson averaged 3.3 points and 2.0 assists per game his first season with the Wildcats. He transferred to South Carolina during his sophomore year. Johnson was forced to miss an entire year of eligibility due to playing in an exhibition game with Villanova. He broke his right foot in a game against Texas A&M and played only 16 games as a junior for the Gamecocks. He was averaging 11.9 points per game up until that point. As a senior, he averaged 9.5 points, 3.5 assists and 2.7 rebounds per game for South Carolina.

Professional career
After graduating from South Carolina, in 2015, he signed with the Rio Grande Valley Vipers of the NBA D-League. He was the only player to make the team by tryout. Johnson averaged 3.5 points, 1.4 rebounds and 1.0 assists per game in 23 games for the Vipers. The following season, he played with the Grand Rapids Cyclones of the Premier Basketball League.

On January 1, 2017, he signed with Al Shamal from Qatar. Johnson posted 18.3 points, 4.3 rebounds, 3.7 assists and 2.0 steals per game with Al Shamal. In September 2017, he signed with Serbian club KK Borac Čačak.

References

External links
Eurobasket.com Profile
RealGM Profile
South Carolina Gamecocks bio

1992 births
Living people
American expatriate basketball people in Qatar
American men's basketball players
Basketball players from New Jersey
Guards (basketball)
Plainfield High School (New Jersey) alumni
Rio Grande Valley Vipers players
South Carolina Gamecocks men's basketball players
Sportspeople from Plainfield, New Jersey
Villanova Wildcats men's basketball players